This article is an index of Lists of ISO 639 codes.
ISO 639 is a set of standards by the International Organization for Standardization that is concerned with representation of names for languages and language groups.
The lists are:
 List of ISO 639-1 codes, with corresponding ISO 639-2 and ISO 639-3 codes
 List of ISO 639-2 codes, with corresponding ISO 639-1 codes
 List of ISO 639-3 codes, with corresponding ISO 639-1 and ISO 639-2 codes
 List of ISO 639-3 macrolanguages, with corresponding ISO 639-1 and ISO 639-2 codes
 List of ISO 639-5 codes, with markers for corresponding ISO 639-2 codes